Ronnbergia is a genus in the plant family Bromeliaceae, subfamily Bromelioideae.  Native to South and Central America, this genus was named for Auguste Ronnberg, Belgian Director of Agriculture and Horticulture in 1874.

Species
, Plants of the World Online accepted 20 species.
 Ronnbergia aciculosa (Mez & Sodiro) Aguirre-Santoro, syns. Ronnbergia nidularioides H.E.Luther, Aechmea aciculosa Mez & Sodiro
 Ronnbergia allenii (L.B.Sm.) Aguirre-Santoro, syn. Ronnbergia petersii L.B.Sm
 Ronnbergia campanulata Gilmartin & H. Luther - Ecuador
 Ronnbergia columbiana É.Morren - Colombia, Peru
 Ronnbergia deleonii L.B. Smith - Colombia, Ecuador
 Ronnbergia drakeana (André) Aguirre-Santoro
 Ronnbergia explodens L.B. Smith - Panama, Ecuador, Peru
 Ronnbergia fraseri (Baker) Aguirre-Santoro
 Ronnbergia germinyana (Carrière) Aguirre-Santoro
 Ronnbergia hathewayi L.B. Smith - Costa Rica, Panama
 Ronnbergia involucrata (André) Aguirre-Santoro
 Ronnbergia killipiana L.B. Smith  - Colombia, Ecuador
 Ronnbergia maidifolia Mez - Colombia, Panama
 Ronnbergia morreniana Linden & André   - Colombia, Ecuador
 Ronnbergia subpetiolata (L.B.Sm.) Aguirre-Santoro
 Ronnbergia tonduzii (Mez & Pittier) Aguirre-Santoro
 Ronnbergia veitchii (Baker) Aguirre-Santoro
 Ronnbergia viridispica (Aguirre-Santoro & Betancur) Aguirre-Santoro
 Ronnbergia weberbaueri (Harms) Aguirre-Santoro
 Ronnbergia wuelfinghoffii (E.Gross) Aguirre-Santoro

Formerly included
 Ronnbergia brasiliensis E.Pereira & I.A.Penna → Wittmackia brasiliensis (E.Pereira & I.A.Penna) Aguirre-Santoro
 Ronnbergia carvalhoi Martinelli & Leme → Wittmackia carvalhoi (Martinelli & Leme) Aguirre-Santoro - Bahia
 Ronnbergia neoregelioides Leme → Wittmackia neoregelioides (Leme) Aguirre-Santoro - Bahia
 Ronnbergia marantoides L.B.Sm. → Lymania marantoides (L.B.Sm.) Read
 Ronnbergia silvana Leme → Wittmackia silvana (Leme) Aguirre-Santoro - Bahia

References

External links

 FCBS Ronnbergia Photos
 BSI Genera Gallery photos

 
Bromeliaceae genera
Taxa named by Édouard André
Taxa named by Charles Jacques Édouard Morren